Milhaud is a commune in the Gard department in southern France. The place name Milhaud is derived from the Roman family name Aemilius (which has also produced the given name Emile) with the suffix -avus. Milhaud station has rail connections to Nîmes, Avignon and Montpellier.

Population

See also
Communes of the Gard department
 Costières de Nîmes AOC

References

Communes of Gard